The Eesti Raadioamatööride Ühing (ERAU) (in English, Estonian Radio Amateurs Union) is a national non-profit organization for amateur radio enthusiasts in Estonia.  Key membership benefits of ERAU include the sponsorship of amateur radio operating awards and radio contests, and a QSL bureau for those members who regularly communicate with amateur radio operators in other countries.  ERAU publishes a semi-annual membership magazine called ES-QTC.  ERAU represents the interests of Estonian amateur radio operators before Estonian and international telecommunications regulatory authorities.  ERAU is the national member society representing Estonia in the International Amateur Radio Union.

See also 
International Amateur Radio Union

References 

International Amateur Radio Union member societies
Clubs and societies in Estonia
Organizations established in 1935
1935 establishments in Estonia
Radio in Estonia
Organizations based in Tallinn